Alamo Navajo Airport  is a public use airport located three nautical miles (6 km) south of the central business district of Alamo, in Socorro County, New Mexico, United States. It is owned by the Alamo Navajo branch of the Navajo Nation.

Facilities 
It has one runway designated 17/35 with a dirt surface measuring 3,650 by 40 feet (1,113 x 12 m).

References

External links 
 Aerial image as of 13 October 1997 from USGS The National Map

Defunct airports in the United States
Airports in New Mexico
Transportation in Socorro County, New Mexico
Buildings and structures in Socorro County, New Mexico
Navajo Nation airports